Aleksandr Beketov (born 14 March 1970) is a Russian fencer and Olympic champion in the épée competition.

He won a gold medal in the épée individual and a team silver medal at the 1996 Summer Olympics in Atlanta.

References

1970 births
Living people
Russian male fencers
Olympic fencers of Russia
Fencers at the 1996 Summer Olympics
Olympic gold medalists for Russia
Olympic silver medalists for Russia
People from Voskresensk
Olympic medalists in fencing
Medalists at the 1996 Summer Olympics
Sportspeople from Moscow Oblast
20th-century Russian people